Bascantis is a genus of moths belonging to the family Tineidae. It contains only one species, Bascantis sirenica, that is endemic to New Zealand. This species is classified as "Data Deficient" by the Department of Conservation.

Taxonomy 
This species was described by Edward Meyrick in 1914 using a specimen collected by George Hudson at Kaeo in January. Hudson discussed and illustrated this species both in his 1928 book The Butterflies and Moths of New Zealand as well as his 1950 publication Fragments of New Zealand entomology. The holotype specimen is held at the Natural History Museum, London.

Description 
Meyrick described the species as follows:

Distribution 
This species is endemic to New Zealand. Along with the type locality of Kaeo, this species has also been collected in Waitākere Ranges, Days Bay, and Wainuiomata. It was last seen in 1950.

Biology and behaviour 

The adult moth is on the wing in January. It is a day flying moth. It has been hypothesised that this moth mimics the appearance of the beetle Zorion guttigerum.

Host species and habitat 
This species has been collected by sweeping in dense forest.

Conservation status 
This moth is classified under the New Zealand Threat Classification system as being Data Deficient.

References

External links

 Image of species

Tineidae
Monotypic moth genera
Moths of New Zealand
Endemic fauna of New Zealand
Taxa named by Edward Meyrick
Tineidae genera
Endemic moths of New Zealand